A wildlife garden (or wild garden) is an environment created by a gardener that serves as a sustainable haven for surrounding wildlife. Wildlife gardens contain a variety of habitats that cater to native and local plants, birds, amphibians, reptiles, insects, mammals and so on. Establishing a garden that emulates the environment before the residence was built and/or renders the garden similar to intact wild areas nearby (rewilding) will allow natural systems to interact and establish an equilibrium, ultimately minimizing the need for gardener maintenance and intervention. Wildlife gardens can also play an essential role in biological pest control, and also promote biodiversity, native plantings, and generally benefit the wider environment.

In the history of gardening the term "wild garden" is more likely to refer to the sort of unstructured garden promoted by the influential Irish gardener and writer William Robinson, whose book The Wild Garden (1870) was very influential; the woodland garden is one legacy. Wildlife was only a peripheral concern of Robinson.

Habitats
Building a successful garden suitable for local wildlife is best accomplished through the use of multiple three-dimensional habitats with diverse structures that provide places for animals to nest and hide. Wildlife gardens may contain a range of habitats, including:

Log piles – Preferably located in a shady area, a pile of logs is a sanctuary for insects and other invertebrates, as well as reptiles and amphibians. The organic structure is a shelter for both protection and breeding. In addition to logs, garden debris may also be added around the garden to be used as a natural mulch, fertilizer, weed control, soil amendment, and habitat for arthropod predators.

Bird feeding stations and bird houses – A place for birds to eat and take shelter will increase the number of birds in the garden, which play a key role in biological pest control. Not only will food and shelter increase the survival rate of birds, but it will also ensure that they are healthy enough for a successful breeding season.

Bug boxes and bee hotels – Bundles of hollow stems (elderberry, Joe-Pye weed, bamboo) can be hung up as an alternate place of shelter and breeding for beneficial insects, such as the Mason bee, which are valuable pollinators.

Sources of water – A water feature, such as a pond, has the potential to support a large biodiversity of wildlife. To maximize the amount of wildlife attracted to the water feature, it should consist of ranging depths. Shallow areas are used by birds to drink and by insects and amphibians to lay eggs. Deeper areas provide habitat for aquatic insects and a place for amphibians, or even fish to swim.

Pollinators – Flowers rich in nectar will attract bees and butterflies into the garden, which is of particular importance given the dramatic reduction in pollinator populations in the US, Europe and elsewhere. Wildflower meadows are an alternative option for lawns in the garden and will serve as a sanctuary for pollinators. However, pollinating plants should not be confused with plants suitable for butterfly breeding.

Plant diversity – The garden should include a range of plant types to act as different habitats. A balance between ground cover, shrub, understory, and canopy species will allow different sized wildlife shelters that fit their individual needs. It is particularly important to use species that are native to the area or state, as native plants will more reliably be suited to insects and other invertebrates than many non-native plants; increased variety of insects is valuable both for its own sake and for birds and other predators.

Choice of plants
Although some exotics may also be included, as discussed in the previous section, wild gardens usually mostly feature a variety of native species. Generally, these will be a part of the pre-existing natural ecology of an area, making them easier to grow than most exotic species. Choosing native plants comes with an array of benefits for both plant and animal diversity, especially the ability to support native insect and fungal populations.

Ornamental plants on the market tend to lean toward "pest-free" plants, making it hard for native insects to adapt, and ultimately reducing their food supply. Decreases in insect populations due to excessive ornamental planting will discourage bird populations from inhabiting the particular area.

Invasive species can always prove problematic in the garden due to the absence of natural predators and their ability to reproduce rapidly. Without any measures of control, invasive species can easily overtake native species in the garden. Addressing invasive plants can be done a variety of ways; however, to ensure the least amount of damage to the surrounding ecosystem, this is best done by cutting down the plant, The debris from the invasive species can be piled and used as a home for smaller critters. In Australia, it has been found that invasive species such as Lantana (Lantana camara) can also provide refuge for bird species such as the superb fairywren (Malurus cyaneus) and silvereye (Zosterops lateralis), in the absence of native plant equivalents. Careful thought about how to balance invasive species management with what is best for urban biodiversity is needed for the best outcome in your garden.

In the Netherlands 
Wildlife gardens in the Netherlands are called "heemtuinen". The first was created in 1925: Thijsse's Hof (Garden of Thijsse) in Bloemendaal, near Haarlem. It was given to Jac. P. Thijsse on the occasion of his 60th anniversary, and still exists today. The garden gives a display of about 800 plants native to the dune region of South Kennemerland, in which the garden is situated. It is said to be one of the oldest wildlife gardens of its sort in the world.

Nowadays, some 25 wildlife gardens exist in the Netherlands.

See also

 List of garden types
 Backyard Wildlife Habitat
 Butterfly gardening
 Climate-friendly gardening
 Native plant gardening
 Natural landscaping
 Permaculture
 Wilderness (garden history)

References

External links
 National Wildlife Federation: Garden for wildlife (USA)
 Wild Ones: Native Plants, Natural Landscapes (USA)
 Wild about Gardens (UK)
 In-depth guide to all aspects of wildlife gardening (UK)
 Wildscaping (California)
 Backyards for Wildlife (Adelaide, Australia)
 Comprehensive wildlife gardening guide for US, Canada and UK
 Gardens for Wildlife Victoria(Australia)

Types of garden
Organic gardening
Conservation projects
Ecological restoration
Habitats
Wildlife